Sir Nicholas Lawes (1652 – 18 June 1731) (sometimes "'Laws'" in contemporary documents) was Governor of Jamaica from 1718 to 1722.

Early life 
Nicholas Lawes was born in 1652 to Nicholas and Amy Lawes.

Knighthood 
He was a British knight.

Governor of Jamaica 
He was Chief Justice of Jamaica from 1698 to 1703 and Governor from 1718 to 1722.

In his capacity as Governor during the Golden Age of Piracy he hunted down or tried many pirates, among them "Calico Jack" Rackham, Anne Bonny, Mary Read, Robert Deal, Captain Thompson, Nicholas Brown, and Charles Vane. He signed an arrangement with Jeremy, king of the Miskito, to bring some of his followers over to Jamaica to hunt down runaway slaves and Jamaican Maroons in 1720.

Family 
Lawes married five widows in succession. No children survived from the first three marriages.

James and Temple Lawes were the sons of his fourth wife Susannah Temple whom he married in 1698. She had previously been married to Samuel Bernard. Her father, Thomas Temple, is said to have given Lawes his Temple Hall, Jamaica estate as a dowry.

Lawes later married Elizabeth Lawley (1690-1725), widow of Thomas Cotton, and daughter of Sir Thomas Lawley, 3rd Baronet and his first wife Rebecca Winch, daughter of Sir Humphrey Winch, 1st Baronet. Their youngest surviving daughter, Judith Maria Lawes, married Simon Luttrell, 1st Earl of Carhampton and so became both wife and mother of the Earls of Carhampton and mother of Anne, Duchess of Cumberland and Strathearn.

Coffee and printing
At Temple Hall Lawes experimented with a variety of crops and introduced the very lucrative coffee growing into the island in 1721 according to some sources or 1728 according to others.

He is also credited with setting up the first printing press in Jamaica.

Death 
He died on 18 June 1731 in Jamaica.

References

1652 births
1731 deaths
Chief justices of Jamaica
Governors of Jamaica
Colony of Jamaica judges
People involved in anti-piracy efforts
18th-century Jamaican judges